Kardiotissa, anciently, Lagusa or Lagousa or Lagussa or Lagoussa (Λαγοῦσσα), is a Greek island in the Cyclades. It is uninhabited and administratively a part of the island community of Sikinos. It lies midway between that island and the island of Folegandros.

References

External links
Official website of Community of Sikinos 

Cyclades
Islands of the South Aegean
Islands of Greece
Landforms of Thira (regional unit)
Uninhabited islands of Greece